The Illinois–Northwestern football rivalry is a college football rivalry between the Illinois Fighting Illini and Northwestern Wildcats. The Land of Lincoln Trophy is presented to the winner of the game. The teams began competing for the new prize in 2009, replacing the Sweet Sioux Tomahawk, which was used from 1945 to 2008.

Traveling trophies

Sweet Sioux Tomahawk 
The Sweet Sioux Tomahawk was presented to the winner of the annual football game between the two schools. The original trophy was a carved wooden "cigar store" Indian, but was stolen and replaced by a replica of a tomahawk.

Northwestern won the Tomahawk first in 1945, beating Illinois 13–7 in Evanston. At the end of the 2008 football season, when the teams last played for the trophy, Illinois lead the series 52–45–5, and 33–29–2 during the era of the Tomahawk. Northwestern narrowed the series record in the trophy's final years, winning five of the last six meetings.

The 2008 game in Evanston was the final time the two teams played for the Tomahawk, which Northwestern won 27–10. The NCAA mandated that all Native American imagery deemed hostile and abusive must be removed from college athletics, including the Sweet Sioux Tomahawk. Before the game, the schools agreed that Northwestern would be the trophy's permanent resting place. If Illinois had won the game, it would have surrendered the trophy to Northwestern after the on-field celebration.

Land of Lincoln Trophy 
Beginning in 2009, the two schools played for the Land of Lincoln Trophy. The trophy's name derives from the official state nickname of Illinois and depicts a bronze replica of a stovepipe hat famously worn by Abraham Lincoln. It was designed by Dick Tracy cartoonist Dick Locher and cast by sculptor Don Reed of River's Edge Foundry, Beloit Wisconsin.

Northwestern won the trophy in its inaugural game in 2009. The 2010 contest was played at Wrigley Field, home of Major League Baseball's Chicago Cubs. It was the first football game at Wrigley Field since 1970 and the first collegiate football game at Wrigley Field since 1938. The field used an east-west field configuration (home plate to right field). In order to keep the playing field at regulation size, the safety clearances for each end zone to the walls in the field were considerably less than normal. In particular, the east (right field) end zone came under scrutiny as its end zone was wedged extremely close to the right field wall (as close as one foot in some areas), forcing the goal posts to be hung from the right field wall in order to fit. Despite extra padding provided in these locations, it was decided that all offensive plays for both teams play to the west end zone, where there was more safety clearance. The east end zone could still be used on defensive touchdowns and punt returns, as well as defensive safeties; in fact, there was one interception run back for an eastbound touchdown. Illinois won 48–27.

Since 2014, the game has become a division contest as Illinois and Northwestern are aligned into the Big Ten's Western division to accommodate the arrival of Maryland and Rutgers. The Big Ten announced its plans to realign its schools geographically in April 2013 in time for the 2014 football season.

Game results

See also
 List of NCAA college football rivalry games
 List of most-played college football series in NCAA Division I

References 

College football rivalries in the United States
Illinois Fighting Illini football
Northwestern Wildcats football
Big Ten Conference rivalries
1892 establishments in Illinois